Photographs (2002) is the first solo studio album from Andrew Osenga. Originally released in 2002, it was re-released at the same time as his second full-length studio album, The Morning (2006).

Track listing
All songs are written by Andrew Osenga.
  "Kankakee"
  "Kara"
  "The High School Band"
  "Photograph"
  "The Man Of the House"
  "We Were Sure We Would Change The World"
  "Vegas"
  "When Will I Run"
  "Too Far To Walk"
  "Beautiful Girl"
  "New Mexico"
  "The High School Band (Acoustic Version)" (only available on 2006 re-release)
  "New Mexico (Late-Night Piano Version)" (only available on 2006 re-release)

2002 albums
Andrew Osenga albums